This is a list of notable events in Latin music (i.e., music from the Spanish- and Portuguese-speaking areas Latin America, Latin Europe, and the United States) that took place in 1999.

Events 
February 24 — The 41st Annual Grammy Awards are held at the Shrine Auditorium in Los Angeles.:
Vuelve by Ricky Martin wins the award for Best Latin Pop Performance.
Contra la Corriente by Marc Anthony wins the award for Best Tropical Latin Performance.
Los Super Seven's self-titled album wins the award for Best Mexican-American Music Performance
Sueños Líquidos by Maná wins the award for Best Latin Rock/Alternative Performance.
Said and Done by Flaco Jiménez wins the award for Best Tejano Music Performance.
Hot House by Arturo Sandoval wins the award for Best Latin Jazz Performance.
May 6 — The 11th Annual Lo Nuestro Awards are held at the James L. Knight Center in Miami, Florida. Puerto Rican American singer Elvis Crespo is the most awarded artist with five wins.
April 20 to April 22 — Billboard holds its 10th Annual Latin Music Conference at the Fontainebleau Hotel in Miami, Florida.
In the same week, Billboard holds its 6th Annual Latin Music Awards on April 22. Puerto Rican American singer Elvis Crespo is the most awarded artist with four wins. Spanish singer Rocío Dúrcal is inducted into the Billboard Latin Music Hall of Fame.
November 20 — The Latin Academy of Recording Arts & Sciences announces that the inaugural Latin Grammy Awards would held in 2001. The new music awards would encompass music Latin America, Spain, Portugal, and the United States. It would later be pushed forward to September 2000.
December 26 — The Recording Industry Association of America (RIAA) reports a 12% growth on the Latin music market in the United States compared to 1998. This gives Latin music a 4.9% share of the total music market. The report does not include sales of albums done by English-speaking Latino artists as the RIAA only considers an album to be "Latin" if 51% or more of its content is recorded in Spanish.

Bands formed

Bands reformed

Bands disbanded

Bands on hiatus

Number-ones albums and singles by country 
List of number-one albums of 1999 (Spain)
List of number-one singles of 1999 (Spain)
List of number-one Billboard Top Latin Albums of 1999
List of number-one Billboard Hot Latin Tracks of 1999

Awards 
1999 Premio Lo Nuestro
 1999 Billboard Latin Music Awards
1999 Tejano Music Awards

Albums released

First quarter

January

February

March

Second quarter

April

May

June

Third quarter

July

August

September

Fourth quarter

October

November

December

Unknown

Best-selling records

Best-selling albums
The following is a list of the top 10 best-selling Latin albums in the United States in 1999, according to Billboard.

Best-performing songs
The following is a list of the top 10 best-performing Latin songs in the United States in 1999, according to Billboard.

Births 
January 5 – Miguelito, Puerto Rican reggaeton singer
January 11Christian Nodal, Mexican ranchera singer
June 27Aitana, Spanish pop singer
August 7Mariah Angeliq, American reggaeton singer
August 13Giulia Be, Brazilian pop singer

Deaths 
January 14 – Sabina Olmos, 85, Argentine tango singer and actress
February 17 – Tania, 105, Spanish-Argentine tango singer and actress
March 19 – Juanita Reina, 73, Spanish actress and singer of copla music
September 14 – , 70, Argentine-Cuban musician
October 6 – Amália Rodrigues, 79, Portuguese singer known worldwide as the "Queen of Fado".

References 

 
Latin music by year